Hong Kong Council may refer to:

 Hong Kong Council for Accreditation of Academic and Vocational Qualifications, a council accrediting higher education courses
 Hong Kong Trade Development Council, a global marketing arm and service hub for Hong Kong-based manufacturers and traders
 The Hong Kong Council of Social Service, a council coordinating NGOs in the social service field in Hong Kong
 Hong Kong Council of the Church of Christ in China, a Protestant Christian church organisation in Hong Kong